WHNY (1000 kHz) is an American AM radio station broadcasting a country music format, simulcasting WHNY-FM 104.7 Henry, Tennessee. Licensed to Paris, Tennessee, United States, it serves the Jackson, Tennessee, area. The station is owned by Forever Media, through licensee Forever South Licenses, LLC, and features programming from Westwood One.

On March 2, 2020, WHNY changed their format from oldies to classic country, simulcasting WHNY-FM 104.7, branded as "Big Henry".

FM translator
In addition to the main station at 1000 kHz, WHNY is relayed by an FM translator to widen its broadcast area and, in this case, allow 24 hours broadcasting of the format. WHNY is a daytime-only station. The FM translator also gives the listener the advantage of FM broadcasting in high fidelity stereo sound.

Previous logo

References

External links

HNY (AM)
Country radio stations in the United States
Radio stations established in 1980
1980 establishments in Tennessee
HNY